The 1937 Alabama Crimson Tide football team (variously "Alabama", "UA" or "Bama") represented the University of Alabama in the 1937 college football season. It was the Crimson Tide's 44th overall and 5th season as a member of the Southeastern Conference (SEC). The team was led by head coach Frank Thomas, in his seventh year, and played their home games at Denny Stadium in Tuscaloosa and Legion Field in Birmingham, Alabama. They finished the season with a record of nine wins and one loss (9–1 overall, 6–0 in the SEC), as SEC champions and with a loss against California in the 1938 Rose Bowl.

The Crimson Tide opened the season with three consecutive shutouts against Howard, Sewanee and South Carolina. In their fourth game, Alabama surrendered their first points of the season on defense in their 14–7 victory over Tennessee. They then shutout their next two opponents, George Washington and Kentucky prior to their game at Tulane. Against the Green Wave, the Crimson Tide won 9–6 on a game-winning fourth-quarter field goal by Hayward Sanford. After their sixth shutout of the season against Georgia Tech, Alabama won their second game of the season on a fourth quarter Sanford field goal against Vanderbilt, and clinched the SEC championship with the win. With their undefeated regular season, Alabama accepted an invitation to play in the 1938 Rose Bowl where they lost 13–0 to California.

Before the season
After the 1936 season, the first expansion of Denny Stadium was undertaken. The stadium originally opened for the 1929 season, and the concrete stands had a seating capacity of 12,000. The 1937 expansion included the construction of a 6,000 seat eastern addition that was utilized primarily by students. Its construction was financed with a combination of funding from both the university ($140,000) and a grant from the Public Works Administration ($90,000). Designed after the Yale Bowl, at the time of this expansion the school envisioned a build-out of Denny Stadium at a capacity of 66,000.

Schedule

Game summaries

Howard

Source:

To open the 1937 season, Alabama outgained Howard (now Samford University) in total yards 198 to 6, and defeated the Bulldogs 41–0 at Denny Stadium. The Crimson Tide scored a pair of touchdowns in each of the first two quarters to take a 28–0 halftime lead. First-quarter touchdowns were scored on a 21-yard Joe Kilgrow touchdown pass to George Zivich and on a Perron Shoemaker blocked punt returned 15-yards for the score. In the second, touchdowns were scored by Herschel Mosley on a 91-yard punt return and on a 10-yard Mosley to Bud Waites touchdown pass. The Crimson Tide then closed the game with a pair of second half touchdowns for the 41–0 victory. Charlie Holm scored on a four-yard run in the third and Alvin Davis scored on a 19-yard run in the fourth. The victory improved Alabama's all-time record against Howard to 15–0–1.

Sewanee

Source:

In the conference opener, Alabama defeated the Sewanee Tigers 65–0 at Legion Field in rainy conditions. In the game, Alabama outgained the Tigers 600 to 27 yards in total offense with both Charlie Holm and Joe Kilgrow each having gained over 100 yards rushing. The Crimson Tide also scored ten total touchdowns with Silas Beard, Kilgrow, Herschel Mosley and Billy Slemons each scoring two and both Holm and George Zivich each scoring one in the victory. The victory improved Alabama's all-time record against Sewanee to 16–10–3.

South Carolina

Sources:

Against the South Carolina Gamecocks of the Southern Conference Alabama won 20–0 at Denny Stadium in what was the first all-time meeting between the schools. Touchdowns were scored by Joe Kilgrow on a short run in the first, on a 33-yard Kilgrow pass to Silas Beard in the second and on a one-yard Hal Hughes run in the third.

Tennessee

Source:

In Knoxville, Alabama defeated rival Tennessee 14–7 at Shields-Watkins Field one year after their scoreless tie at Legion Field. The overflow crowd of 25,000 included Tennessee Governor Gordon Browning and Alabama Governor Frank M. Dixon. After a scoreless first quarter, the Crimson Tide took a 7–0 lead in the second quarter after a Carey Cox interception set up the scoring drive. The touchdown was scored by Vic Bradford on a two-yard quarterback sneak to complete a 60-yard drive. In the third, Alabama extended their lead to 14–0 after Hal Hughes scored on a one-yard quarterback sneak. The Volunteers responded in the fourth with their only points, a three-yard George Cafego touchdown pass to Edwin Duncan to complete an 85-yard drive. The Tennessee touchdown was the first points allowed by the Crimson Tide defense of the season. The victory improved Alabama's all-time record against Tennessee to 13–5–2.

George Washington

Source:

As the entered their game against George Washington, Alabama was ranked No. 2 in the first AP Poll of the 1937 season. In the contest, the Crimson Tide defeated the Colonials 19–0 at Griffith Stadium. For the second week in a row, Alabama was held scoreless in the first quarter, however a pair of second-quarter touchdowns gave the Crimson Tide a 13–0 halftime lead. In the second, touchdowns were scored by Joe Kilgrow on a 35-yard pass to Perron Shoemaker and Kilgrow on a six-yard run. The final points of the game were scored by Charlie Holm in the third after he returned an interception 30-yards for a touchdown. The win improved Alabama's all-time record against George Washington to 3–0.

Kentucky

Source:

As Alabama entered their homecoming contest against Kentucky, they dropped one place to No. 3 in the weekly poll. In the game, the Crimson Tide defeated the Wildcats 41–0 before 13,000 at Denny Stadium. After Charlie Holm scored on a 27-yard touchdown run in the first, the Crimson Tide scored three second-quarter touchdowns for a 27–0 halftime lead. The second-quarter touchdowns were scored by Gene Blackwell on a six-yard run, Joe Kilgrow on a 20-yard run and on a ten-yard Herschel Mosley pass to Johnny Roberts. Alabama then closed the game with a pair one-yard touchdown runs in the second half for the 41–0 win. The first was scored by Billy Slemons in the third and the second by W. L. Waites in the fourth. The victory improved Alabama's all-time record against Kentucky 16–1.

Tulane

Source:

After their victory over Kentucky, the Crimson Tide moved up one position and regained the No. 2 spot in the weekly poll. Tulane was ranked No. 19 in the poll after their victory over Ole Miss. In the contest, the Crimson Tide defeated the Green Wave 9–6 after they converted a game-winning field goal late in the fourth quarter. Tulane took a 6–0 lead in the first when John Andrews scored on a one-yard run three plays after William Kirchem blocked an Alabama punt to give the Greenies possession at the Tide's 18-yard line. Alabama did not score until early in the third when Vic Bradford completed an 87-yard drive with his one-yard touchdown run, and after a missed extra point the game was tied at six. With less than two minutes remaining in the fourth, Hayward Sanford kicked a 23-yard field goal to win the game. The victory improved Alabama's all-time record against Tulane to 11–3–1.

Georgia Tech

Source:

After their close victory over Tulane, the Crimson Tide dropped one position to the No. 3 spot in the weekly poll in spite of having more first-place voted than No. 2 California. In their game against Georgia Tech, the game remained scoreless before a fourth-quarter touchdown gave Alabama the 7–0 victory over the Yellow Jackets at Legion Field. In the fourth, Joe Kilgrow threw the game-winning two-yard touchdown pass to Erin Warren with only four minutes remaining in the game for the 7–0 win. The victory improved Alabama's all-time record against Georgia Tech to 11–10–2.

Vanderbilt

Source:

After their victory over Georgia Tech, Alabama had a bye week prior to their annual Thanksgiving Day game against Vanderbilt. Prior to their game, Alabama dropped to No. 4 and Vanderbilt moved up to No. 12 in the weekly AP Poll. In the game against the Commodores, Alabama won their second game of the season with a fourth quarter field goal in their 9–7 win at Dudley Field. After a scoreless first, the Crimson Tide took a 6–0 lead in the second quarter on a Joe Kilgrow touchdown pass to Erin Warren. The Commodores took a 7–6 lead in the third when Hardy Housman scored on a one-yard run and Joe Agee kicked the extra point. However, late in the fourth Hayward Sanford kicked the 27-yard game-winning field goal to give the Crimson Tide the 9–7 win. The victory clinched the SEC championship for the Crimson Tide and improved Alabama's all-time record against Vanderbilt to 10–9.

California

Source:

On November 30, Alabama accepted an invitation to play in the 1938 Rose Bowl against the California Golden Bears. In the game, the Crimson Tide were defeated in their only game of the season after their 13–0 shutout loss before 87,000 fans at Pasadena. Vic Bottari scored both touchdowns for the Golden Bears on runs of four-yards in the second and five-yards in the third. In the loss, the Crimson Tide turned the ball over eight times, on four fumbles and four interceptions. Alabama had two scoring opportunities end inside the California ten-yard line, one on a fumble at the one-yard line and another at the six-yard line. The loss was also Alabama's first in the Rose Bowl Game.

After the season

Awards
After the season, Leroy Monsky was a consensus selection and both Joe Kilgrow and James Ryba were selected to various 1937 College Football All-America Teams.

NFL Draft
Several players that were varsity lettermen from the 1937 squad were drafted into the National Football League (NFL) between the 1938 and 1940 drafts. These players included the following:

Personnel

Varsity letter winners

Coaching staff

References
General

 

Specific

Alabama
Alabama Crimson Tide football seasons
Southeastern Conference football champion seasons
Alabama Crimson Tide football